Jenny Zhang may refer to;

Jenny Zhang (actress) (born 1987), Chinese actress and singer
Jenny Zhang (chemist) (fl. 2000s–2020s), Chinese Australian chemist
Jenny Zhang (writer) (born 1983), American writer, poet, and essayist
Jenny Tinghui Zhang (writer) (active 2015–present), American writer

See also
Jennifer Zhang (fl. 2010s), woodwind musician